Futura Records is a French record company and jazz record label founded in 1969 by Gérard Terronès. Marge Records is a notable subsidiary label.
The label changed its name in 2018 into Futura Marge.

Roster

 Richard Accart
 Françoise Achard
 Pepper Adams
 Gene Adler
 Irene Aebi
 Ricou Albin
 Michel Alibo
 Kamal Alim
 Barry Altschul
 Jean-Claude André
 Jacky Arconte
 Horacee Arnold
 Patrick Artéro
 Georges Arvanitas
 Nicole Aubiat
 Jean-Jacques Avenel
 Billy Bang
 Francis Baron des grottes
 Eric Barret
 Philip Barry
 Claude Barthélémy
 Abdou Beckouri
 Fanfan Belles Cuisses
 Roquet Belles Oreilles
 Mourad Benhammou
 Abdelhaï Bennani
 Yves Berg
 Dominique Berose
 Jac Berrocal
 Michel Bertier
 Airelle Besson
 John Betsch
 Zéno Bianu
 Cyrille Bibounet
 Charly Bidineux
 François Billard
 Marvin Blackman
 Jean-Philippe Blin
 Jacques Bolognesi
 Bastien Boni
 Raymond Boni
 Maurice Bouhana
 Francky Bourlier
 Mario Branlo
 Anthony Braxton
 Willem Breuker
 Cameron Brown
 George Brown
 Marion Brown
 Rob Brown
 Kendall Buchanan
 Michel Bulteau
 Roy Burrowes
 Jaki Byard
 Jerry Byrd
 Roy Campbell Jr.
 Patrice Caratini
 Didier Carlier
 Daniel Carter
 Kent Carter
 Philippe Catan
 Jean-François Catoire
 Olivier Cauquil
 Jean-Paul Celea
 Jean-Claude Cenci
 Marc Chambon
 Alain "Paco" Charlery
 Remi Charmasson
 Jean-Louis Chautemps
 Pierre Chereze
 Brigitte Choupette
 Pierre Christophe
 Ernest Guiraud Cissé
 Curtis Clark
 Gerald Cleaver
 Jerome Cooper
 Levender Cope
 Ray Copeland
 Dominique Coster
 Pierre Courbois
 Emmanuel Cremer
 Clyde Crymer
 Bob Cunningham
 Frank Curier
 Ted Curson
 Leo Cuypers
 Andrew Cyrille
 Chris Dailey McCraven
 Dominique Dalmasso
 Irene Datcher
 Art Davis
 Richard Davis
 Charles Davis
 Santi De Briano
 Irakly de Davrichewy
 Chris de Foy
 Patrick De Groote
 Laurent de Wilde
 Raphaël Dever
 Bruno Di Goia
 Frankie Di Lagio
 Akua Dixon
 Sophia Domancich
 Laure Donnat
 Dany Doriz
 Hamid Drake
 Rémy Dédé Dréano
 Bob Driessen
 Jean-Pierre Drouet
 Daniel Dublet
 Benjamin Duboc
 Philippe Duchemin
 Johnny Dyani
 Carl Ector
 Michel Edelin
 Paco el Lobo
 Steve Ellington
 Henri-Jean Enu
 Goran Eriksson
 Olav Estienne
 Charles Eubanks
 Cheikh Tidiane Fall
 Jacques Fassola
 Roger Ferlet
 Michel Fernandez
 Glenn Ferris
 Marcus Fiorillo
 Joe Fonda
 Ricky Ford
 Jean-Marc Foussat
 Claudine François
 Laurent Geniez
 Daniel Geoffroy
 Gérard Gélas
 Patrick Géoffrois
 Denis Gheerbrandt
 Lafayette Gilchrist
 John Gilmore
 Jef Gilson
 Dexter Gordon
 Arjen Gorter
 Simon Goubert
 Jacques Gouré
 Pierre-Olivier Govin
 Enrico Granafei
 Rael Wesley Grant
 Lou Grassi
 Candice Greene
 Charles Greenlee
 Jack Gregg
 Roger Gremillot
 Sonny Grey
 Dick Griffin
 Alexandra Grimal
 Dieter Guevissier
 Jean Guérin
 Roger Guérin
 Beb Guérin
 Sylvain Guérineau
 François Guildon
 Ernest Guiraud Cissé
 Barry Guy
 Doug Hammond
 Billy Harper
 Ray Harris
 Yves Hasselmann
 Didier Hauck
 Guy Hayat
 Roy Haynes
 Eddie Henderson
 Fred Hersch
 John Hicks
 Patience Higgins
 Benoit Holliger
 Everett Hollins
 Sylvia Howard
 Bernard Hunnekink
 David Jackson
 Ambrose Jackson
 Hakim Jami
 Clifford Jarvis
 Alain Jean-Marie
 Jean-François Jenny Clark
 Terry Jenoure
 Kevin Jones
 Philly Joe Jones
 Bert Jouis
 Ray Kaczynski
 Siegfried Kessler
 Lansine Kouyaté
 Peter Kowald
 Bob Kunningham
 Thierry dit Kühl le clown
 Joachim Kühn
 Papé l' écrivain
 Christophe Laborde
 Steve Lacy
 Oliver Lake
 Didier Lasserre
 Jobic le Masson
 Fernand le salé darlès
 Fred le vicomte électrique
 Patricia Lebeugle
 Ronald Lecourt
 Benjamin Legrand
 Dominique Lentin
 Jean-Pierre Lentin
 Didier Levallet
 Victor Lewis
 Christian Lété
 Chris Lightcap
 Kirk Lightsey
 Abbey Lincoln
 Wilbur Little
 Sébastien Llado
 Guillaume Loizillon
 Frank Lowe
 Barbara Lowengreen
 Eric Löhrer
 Curtis Lundy
 Paul Lytton
 Véronique Magdelenat
 Didier Malherbe
 Fred Malle
 Gérard Marais
 Stu Martin
 Philippe Martineau
 Philippe Maté
 Art Matthews
 Ray Mauger
 Bénédicte Maulet
 Steve Mc Call
 Charles McGee
 Hirshel McGinnis
 Joe McPhee
 François Méchali
 Gilles Mézières
 Claude Micheli
 Mine
 Pépée Minègue
 Jouck Minor
 Roland Molinier
 Gato Montauban
 Matt Moran
 Pierre Moret
 Wilber Morris
 Lawrence 'Butch' Morris
 Benjamin Moussay
 David Murray
 Margriet Naber
 Gilles Naturel
 Guillaume Naturel
 Nolle Neels
 Harvey Neneux
 Marce of Mémé Flippée
 Itaru Oki
 Leïla Olivesi
 Ferhat Öz
 Evrim Özsuca
 Antoine Paganotti
 Guy Paquin
 Jeff Parker
 William Parker
 Evan Parker
 Stéphane Payen
 Sylvie Peristeris
 Walter Perkins
 Félix Perron
 Pierrick Pédron
 Barre Phillips
 Alain Pinsolle
 Michel Portal
 Steve Potts
 Jean-Claude Pourtier
 Eddie Preston
 John Purcell
 Joe Quitzke
 Boy Raaymakers
 Joseph Racaille
 Hugh Ragin
 Sha Rakotofiringa
 Alain Raman
 Roger Raspail
 Richard Raux
 Antonin Rayon
 Luc Rebelles
 Freddie Redd
 Jean-Marie Redon
 Dizzy Reece
 Wolfgang Reisinger
 Marc Richard
 Adil Riski
 Sam Rivers
 Christian Rollet
 Jean-Paul Rondepierre
 Yvon Rosillette
 Brandon Ross
 Hilton Ruiz
 Leo Sab
 Arnaud Sacase
 Mokhtar Samba
 Réda Samba
 Jacky Samson
 Maré Sanogo
 Bernard Santacruz
 Makoto Sato
 Charles Saudrais
 Julie Saury
 Emmanuel Scarpa
 Jean-Jacques Schnell
 Bruno Schorp
 John Schroder
 Jeff Yochk'o Seffer
 Jaribu Shahid
 Avery Sharpe
 Sonny Sharrock
 Archie Shepp
 Sahib Shihab
 Doug Sides
 Alan Silva
 Sonny Simmons
 Hal Singer
 Warren Smith
 Philippe Soirat
 Pierre-Yves Sorin
 James Spaulding
 Louis 'Mbiki' Spears
 Daiva Starinskaite
 Anna Startseva
 Charles Stephens
 Gil Sterg
 John Stewart
 Ricardo Strobert
 Marc Stutz-Boukouya
 Gilbert Sulma Pontoise
 John Surman
 Eric Surmenian
 Pierre Surtel
 Armand Talot Man
 Claude Talvat
 Art Taylor
 John Tchicai
 Jacques Thollot
 Malachi Thompson
 Tonton
 Jean My Truong
 Assif Tsahar
 Steve Turre
 François Tusques
 Paul Van Gysegem
 Willem Van Manen
 Maarten Van Norden
 Jasper Van't Hof
 André Velter
 Jaanika Ventsel
 Rob Verdurmen
 Patrick Vian
 Bernard Vitet
 Aly Wagué
 Freddie Waits
 Mal Waldron
 Andrea Walter
 James Ware
 Reggie Washington
 Ben Webster
 Mark Whitecage
 Barney Wilen
 Michelle Wiley
 Joe Lee Wilson
 Jan Wolf
 Chris Woods
 Reggie Workman
 Octave Z
 Michael Zerang

External links
 (French and English)

Jazz record labels
French companies established in 1969
French record labels
French jazz
Record labels established in 1969